Garro is a Basque surname.

Garro may also refer to:

 Garró a grape cultivar
 La Garro, a DC Comics character
 Captain Nathaniel Garro, a Warhammer 40K Horus Heresy character

See also

 
 
 O'Garro (surname)
 Garros (disambiguation)